Shin Woo-yeong, better known by his in-game name Seraph, is a South Korean professional League of Legends player who was most recently the top laner for RunAway. He has also played for NaJin White Shield, Counter Logic Gaming, Team Dragon Knights and Team Envy.

Career 
Seraph began his League Legends career as a top lane substitute for NaJin White Shield, though he only played one game with the team in OGN. When Counter Logic Gaming announced that they were searching globally for a new top laner, Seraph approached MonteCristo at an event and requested a tryout.

On May 1, 2014, it was announced that CLG was flying Seraph to North America to try him out as their new top laner.
On May 19, 2014, he officially joined the team.

The community had high expectations for CLG Seraph, and at first the team did well, a contender for first place in the region for the first eight weeks of the summer split, but ultimately they were unable to qualify for Worlds and Seraph's performance was called into question.

2015 Preseason 
On November 7, CLG announced that they were opting not to resign Seraph for the 2015 season. He was replaced on the starting roster by ZionSpartan.

Seraph changed his name to kina and joined Team Dragon Knights in January. They played in the NACS Spring Qualifier, where they defeated Team Frostbite and Storm to qualify for the spring season; he then started playing under the name Seraph again.

2015 season 
Team Dragon Knights qualified for the spring season of NACS, beating Team Frostbite and Storm in the qualifier. They placed second in the season with a 7-3 record, behind Enemy eSports. In the playoffs, they beat Team Fusion 2-1 before losing to Enemy 1-3, sending them to the summer promotion tournament. Despite the fact that they had placed higher than Fusion, Winterfox chose to play against them. TDK used substitute mid laner Alex Ich in their promotional matches and won 3-1, successfully qualifying for the NA LCS Summer Split.

Due to visa issues, Team Dragon Knights were unable to use their full roster for the first four weeks of the summer split, as Emperor and Ninja were unable to travel to the United States to play with the team. They instead substituted in LattmaN for Emperor and Bischu and mancloud for Ninja; Baby also substituted for Smoothie for their first three games. The substitute rosters went a combined 0-9, but when Emperor and Ninja finally joined the team for the second day of the fifth week, the team defeated first-place Team Dignitas. Despite that initial success, Team Dragon Knights were only able to secure two more victories over the next four weeks, and they finished in last place with a 3-15 record, one game behind Enemy. As a result, they were automatically relegated to the 2016 NA Challenger Series Spring Season.

2016 Preseason 
From September to December 2015, Team Dragon Knights briefly renamed to Team Arena Online; however, they changed their name back due to concerns from Riot about the title sponsor Arena Online fulfilling their promises to the community regarding a million-dollar tournament circuit.
Seraph, Ninja, and Kez stayed with the team through both renamings; however, Ninja was suspended for two months for his role in an attempt to recruit Samsung AD carry Fury while he was under contract.

Tournament results

Team Envy 
 5th—6th — 2017 NA LCS Summer
 6th — 2017 NA LCS Summer regular season
 10th — 2017 NA LCS season regular season
 7th — 2016 NA LCS Summer regular season
 6th — 2016 NA LCS Summer playoffs

Renegades 
 8th — 2016 NA LCS Spring regular season

Team Impulse 
 9th — 2016 NA LCS Spring regular season

Counter Logic Gaming
 6th - 2014 NA LCS Summer regular season

References 

Team Envy players
Living people
Renegades (esports) players
Team Dragon Knights players
Counter Logic Gaming players
League of Legends top lane players
Place of birth missing (living people)
Year of birth missing (living people)
South Korean esports players